Munson is an unincorporated community and census-designated place in Santa Rosa County, Florida, United States. Its population was 372 as of the 2010 census. Florida State Road 4 passes through the community.

Geography

References

Unincorporated communities in Santa Rosa County, Florida
Unincorporated communities in Florida
Census-designated places in Santa Rosa County, Florida
Census-designated places in Florida